Pierre Bruneau may refer to:

 Pierre Bruneau (journalist) (born 1952), Canadian journalist and news anchor
 Pierre Bruneau (politician) (1761–1820), merchant and political figure in Lower Canada
  (born 1961), in events such as the 2010 24 Hours of Le Mans